Davide Appollonio (born 2 June 1989) is an Italian professional road bicycle racer, who most recently rode for UCI Continental team .

Career
Born in Isernia, Appollonio first made an impression in the professional ranks riding as a stagiaire for  during the latter part of 2009, before signing for the team as a neo-pro for the 2010 season.

He joined  for the 2011 season, picking up his first win for the team on the 3rd stage of the Tour de Luxembourg, and then his first overall Sprints competition the following day. Appollonio left  at the end of the 2012 season, and joined  on a two-year contract from the 2013 season onwards. In October 2014 he announced that he would join  for 2015, the first time Appollonio had joined an Italian professional cycling team.

On 30 June 2015 Appollonio gave an adverse analytical finding for EPO, on 14 June – two weeks after completing the Giro d'Italia, and was provisionally suspended.

Major results

2009
 5th Gran Premio della Liberazione
 6th Gran Premio Palio del Recioto
2010
 1st Stage 4 Tour du Limousin
 2nd Grand Prix de Fourmies
 2nd Tour de Vendée
 5th Clásica de Almería
 7th Coppa Sabatini
 10th Grand Prix Pino Cerami
2011
 Tour de Luxembourg
1st  Points classification
1st Stage 3
 1st Stage 1 Tour du Poitou-Charentes
 7th Overall Ster ZLM Toer
2012
 4th London Nocturne
2013
 5th Paris–Bourges
2014
 2nd Roma Maxima
 6th Scheldeprijs
2015
1st  Points classification Tour of Slovenia
 3rd Grand Prix of Aargau Canton
2019
 1st Stage 1 Volta a Portugal

Grand Tour general classification results timeline

References

External links

Italian male cyclists
1989 births
Living people
Doping cases in cycling
Italian sportspeople in doping cases
Sportspeople from the Province of Isernia